This is a list of selected dishes found in Indonesian cuisine.

Staple foods

Main dishes

Curries

Meals

Soy-based foods

Preserved meats

Rice dishes and porridges

Congees and porridges

Rice cake dishes

Rice dishes

Noodle dishes

Soups and stews

Salads and vegetable dishes

Breads and sandwiches

Snacks and starters

Savoury snacks

Sweet snacks

Crackers, chips, and crisps

Sweet desserts

Cheeses

Beverages

Seasonings and condiments

Common ingredients

Spices

 Anise (Adas Manis)
 Asam kandis (dried fruit of Garcinia xanthochymus)
 Asam sunti (dried fruit of Averrhoa bilimbi)
 Candlenuts (Kemiri)
 Cardamom (Kapulaga)
 Chili (Cabai)
 Cinnamon (Kayu Manis)
 Clove (Cengkeh)
 Coriander seeds (Ketumbar)
 Cumin seeds (Jinten)
 Fennel (Adas)
 Fenugreek (Klabet)
 Fingerroot (Temu Kunci)
 Galangal (Lengkuas)
 Garcinia atroviridis (Asam Gelugur)
 Garlic (Bawang putih)
 Shallot (Bawang merah)
 Onion (Bawang bombay)
 Ginger (Jahe)
 Kaempferia galanga (Kencur)
 Nutmeg (Pala)
 Pangium edule (Kluwak)
 Star anise (Pekak, bunga lawang)
 Tamarind seeds (Asam)
 Torch ginger (Kecombrang, Etlingera elatior)
 Turmeric (Kunyit)
 Zingiber zerumbet (Lempuyang)

Herbs
 Indonesian bay leaves (daun salam)
 Kaffir lime Leaves (daun jeruk purut)
 Lemongrass (serai)
 Pandan (Pandanus amaryllifolius, a variety of Pandanus, used to add a distinct aroma to some dishes and desserts)
 Lemon Basil (kemangi)
 Lime Leaves (daun jeruk)
 Turmeric Leaves (daun kunyit)
 Celery leaves (daun seledri)

Vegetables

Asparagus
Broccoli (brokoli)
Carrot (wortel)
Cassava leaves (daun singkong)
Cauliflower (kembang kol)
Cabbage (kol)
Chayote gourd (labu siam)
Corn (jagung)
Cucumber (timun)
Eggplant (terong)
Jicama (bengkuang)
Sweetcorn (jagung muda)
Snap peas (kapri)
Leek (bawang prei)
Shallot (bawang merah), small red onions (Allium ascalonicum), as also used in south India; more common than large onions (Allium cepa, bawang Bombay)
Garlic (bawang putih)
Leaf amaranth (bayam/bayem); various Amaranthus species, often incorrectly called spinach though they belong to the same family as Spinacia oleracea
Bok choi, pak choi (sawi hijau)
Napa cabbage (sawi putih)
Choi sum (caisim)
Kailan
Chives (kucai)
White carrot (lobak)
Water convolvulus (kangkung)
Green beans (buncis, kacang buncis)
Long beans (kacang panjang)
Winged beans (kecipir)
Bitter gourd (pare)
Beansprout (tauge)
Peas (kacang polong)
Tomato (tomat)
Luffa (oyong)
Papaya leaves (daun pepaya)
Yellow velvetleaf (genjer)
Belinjau (leaves and fruits of Gnetum gnemon)
Young jackfruit (nangka muda)
Banana flower (jantung pisang)

Fruits

 Avocado - Alpukat
 Baccaurea racemosa - Menteng
 Banana - Pisang
 Bouea macrophylla - Gandaria
 Star Fruit - Belimbing
 Coconut - Kelapa
 Duku-Duku
 Durian-Durian
 Guava - Jambu biji
 Grape - Anggur
 Jackfruit - Nangka
 Kaffir lime -Jeruk Obat / Jeruk Limau
 Lime - Jeruk Nipis
 Longan - Kelengkeng
 Lychee - Leci
 Mango - Mangga
 Mangosteen - Manggis
 Orange - Jeruk
 Papaya - Pepaya
 Passionfruit - Markisa
 Persimmon - Kesemek
 Pineapple - Nanas
 Pomelo - Jeruk Bali
 Rambutan-Rambutan
 Snake Fruit - Salak
 Sapodilla - Sawo
 Soursop - Sirsak
 Spondias dulcis - Kedondong
 Syzygium malaccense - Jambu Bol
 Water apple - Jambu air
 Watermelon - Semangka

Gallery

See also
 Cuisine of Indonesia
 List of cuisines
 List of Indonesian beverages
 List of Indonesian desserts
 List of Indonesian snacks
 List of Indonesian soups
 Street food of Indonesia

References

External links
 Culinary Reconnaissance: Indonesia
 Eating the Indonesian way
 Indonesian Recipes
 Indonesian food, recipes and culinary
 Good Indonesian Heritage Food and Cuisine

Dishes